Theodore Edmonds Gildred Jr. (October 18, 1935 – January 3, 2019) was a Mexican-born American businessman and diplomat.

Life
Gildred was born in Mexico City. He served in the United States Army from 1955 to 1959, where he was stationed in Germany, and the United States Air Force Reserve from 1959 to 1969, in which he became a captain. He graduated from Stanford University in 1959. In 1960, he studied at the Sorbonne, and the Heidelberg University.

From 1986 to 1989, he was United States Ambassador to Argentina.

He developed Lomas Santa Fe community development and Country Club, and founded the Gildred Foundation to support Latin American studies at Stanford University and University of California, San Diego.

A pilot, Gildred was, like his father before him, inducted into the San Diego Air and Space Museum Hall of Fame.   

He died in Montana on January 3, 2019, at the age of 83. He had been ill for some time.

Family
In December 1961, he married Suzanne Gail Green of Newport Beach, California. They had four children: Theodore E. Gildred III, Jennifer Lynne Gildred, Edward Ames Gildred, John Taylor Gildred. They divorced in 1974. In 1979, he married Stephanie Ann Moscini. They had two children: Tory Boughton Gildred and Stephen Eckert Gildred. They divorced in 1990. In 1994, he married Heidi Dunn. They remained married until his death, and lived in San Diego, California.

References

External links

1935 births
2019 deaths
20th-century American diplomats
Ambassadors of the United States to Argentina
Stanford University alumni
United States Air Force officers
United States Air Force reservists
United States Army personnel